is the seventh single by Japanese idol group Hinatazaka46. It was released on June 1, 2022, through Sony Music Entertainment Japan. The title track features Nao Kosaka as lead performer. It is the last single featuring Miho Watanabe.

Background 
During the encore on the second day of "Hinatazaka46 3rd Anniversary Memorial Live in Tokyo Dome", they announced the release of the title song of their 7th single, and performed the same song as a surprise.

Production and release 
The single was released in five versions: Type-A, Type-B, Type-C, Type-D, and a regular edition. All versions except for the regular edition also includes a Blu-ray Disc containing music videos and bonus videos.

Nao Kosaka was appointed as center (lead performer) of the title track for the fifth time after the fourth single "Sonna Koto Nai yo" in 2020. During production, she had just recently returned from health leave and did not participate in the more intense dance scenes in the music video for "Koishita Sakana wa Sora o Tobu".

The single is the last one featuring Miho Watanabe, who would leave the group after promotions have concluded. She served as center for the second generation members' B-side song "Koishita Sakana wa Sora wo Tobu", and the music video for "Hikōkigumo ga Dekiru Riyū" is about the closing of a dormitory named "Hidamari", a reference to her 2019 photobook of the same title. "Mayonaka no Zange Taikai" by the first generation members features the first appearance of member Sarina Ushio as lead performer. "Mō Konna ni Suki ni Narenai" was performed by the three Hinatazaka46 members born in 2002 (Hiyori Hamagishi, Nao Kosaka, and Miku Kanemura) and was first revealed at the group's second anniversary concert in March 2021, a year before this single was released. "Shiranai Uchi ni Aisareteita" was performed by all members.

Reception 
"Boku Nanka" sold 478,000 copies in its release week according to Billboard Japan and placed first in both the weekly Oricon Singles and Billboard Japan Hot 100 charts.

Real Sound commented that the rock ballad sound of "Boku Nanka" reflects the growth of the group, especially after experiencing different lead performers in the previous two singles, while the melody represents Kosaka's "ephemeral, fragile radiance" as she returned from her hiatus. "Koishita Sakana wa Sora wo Tobu" was also said to fit Watanabe, who enjoys both rock music and defying conventions, and is reminiscent of the group's origins as the subgroup of Keyakizaka46, who were known for their "cool" songs; on the other hand, "Hikōkigumo ga Dekiru Riyū" with its retro-style music video represents "nostalgia" and the happy memories created by Watanabe and the other members over the years. "Gaufre to Kimi" by the third generation members, with its absence of an obvious lead performer, was said to emphasize the four youngest members' friendship and distinct personalities.

Track listing 
All lyrics written by Yasushi Akimoto.

Type-A

Type-B

Type-C

Type-D

Regular edition

Participating members

"Boku Nanka" 
Center: Nao Kosaka
 1st row: Hinano Kamimura, Kumi Sasaki, Nao Kosaka, Mirei Sasaki, Miku Kanemura
 2nd row: Hiyori Hamagishi, Mei Higashimura, Hina Kawata, Shiho Katō, Kyōko Saitō, Akari Nibu, Konoka Matsuda, Suzuka Tomita
 3rd row: Sarina Ushio, Haruyo Yamaguchi, Mana Takase, Yūka Kageyama, Miho Watanabe, Ayaka Takamoto,  Manamo Miyata, Marī Morimoto, Mikuni Takahashi

"Hikōkigumo ga Dekiru Riyū" 
Center: Nao Kosaka
 1st row: Hinano Kamimura, Kumi Sasaki, Nao Kosaka, Mirei Sasaki, Miku Kanemura
 2nd row: Hiyori Hamagishi, Mei Higashimura, Hina Kawata, Shiho Katō, Kyōko Saitō, Akari Nibu, Konoka Matsuda, Suzuka Tomita
 3rd row: Sarina Ushio, Haruyo Yamaguchi, Mana Takase, Yūka Kageyama, Miho Watanabe, Ayaka Takamoto,  Manamo Miyata, Marī Morimoto, Mikuni Takahashi

"Mō Konna ni Suki ni Narenai" 
Hiyori Hamagishi, Nao Kosaka, Miku Kanemura

"Gaufre to Kimi" 
Marī Morimoto, Haruyo Yamaguchi, Hinano Kamimura, Mikuni Takahashi（3rd Generation Songs）

"Mayonaka no Zange Taikai" 
Center: Sarina Ushio
 1st row: Mana Takase, Sarina Ushio, Yūka Kageyama
 2nd row: Mirei Sasaki, Mei Higashimura, Kyōko Saitō, Shiho Katō, Ayaka Takamoto（1st Generation Songs）

"Koishita Sakana wa Sora wo Tobu" 
Center: Miho Watanabe
 1st row: Miku Kanemura, Miho Watanabe, Nao Kosaka
 2nd row: Suzuka Tomita, Hina Kawata, Konoka Matsuda, Akari Nibu, Manamo Miyata, Hiyori Hamagishi（2nd Generation Songs）

"Shiranai Uchi ni Aisareteita" 
Center: Nao Kosaka
 1st row: Hinano Kamimura, Kumi Sasaki, Nao Kosaka, Mirei Sasaki, Miku Kanemura
 2nd row: Hiyori Hamagishi, Mei Higashimura, Hina Kawata, Shiho Katō, Kyōko Saitō, Akari Nibu, Konoka Matsuda, Suzuka Tomita
 3rd row: Sarina Ushio, Haruyo Yamaguchi, Mana Takase, Yūka Kageyama, Miho Watanabe, Ayaka Takamoto,  Manamo Miyata, Marī Morimoto, Mikuni Takahashi

Charts

Weekly charts

Monthly charts

Year-end charts

Certifications

Notes

References

External links 

  

2022 singles
2022 songs
Hinatazaka46 songs
Songs with lyrics by Yasushi Akimoto
King Records (Japan) singles
Oricon Weekly number-one singles
Billboard Japan Hot 100 number-one singles